Li Lianying (12 November 1848 – 4 March 1911) was a Chinese imperial eunuch who lived in the late Qing dynasty.  He was a eunuch during the regency of Empress Dowager Cixi, who was the de facto ruler of China from 1869 to 1908 throughout the reigns of the Tongzhi Emperor and Guangxu Emperor.

Names
Li's birth name was Li Yingtai. He was renamed Li Jinxi after entering the Forbidden City as a palace eunuch in 1856. In 1869, Empress Dowager Cixi gave him a new name, Li Lianying, which became the name he is best known by.

Life
Li was born in a poor family in Zhili Province (roughly present-day Hebei) in 1848 during the reign of the Daoguang Emperor. He had been in the Forbidden City for several years but did not have the chance to even appear in the presence of the West Empress Dowager, Cixi. The eunuch serving Cixi at that time, Little An, did not let any one threaten his position. Li loved to gamble and because of his constant losses, he had racked up an enormous debt. To escape his debtors, Li left his hometown for the capital. Li would often visit an old eunuch whom he had met in the Forbidden City. From the old eunuch, Li learned that all the eunuchs who have had the privilege to serve and comb the hair of Cixi have been punished, with the exception of Little An. Li set his goal to become Cixi's favorite eunuch. Thus he set forth to master hair design. He went to brothels, not for the ladies, but to learn how they did their hair. After several months, he had finally mastered every aspect of hair design. The old eunuch made it known that Li was a hair specialist and Li was summoned by Cixi. The empress was very satisfied with his work and he became her favorite eunuch, later becoming her head eunuch. Due to only Li satisfying the West Empress Dowager, he was made the general head eunuch in the Forbidden City.

In 1869, An Dehai, the eunuch who served as Grand Supervisor, was executed by Ding Baozhen, the Provincial Governor of Shandong, for travelling out of the Forbidden City without permission. Earlier in 1861, Li had helped Empress Dowager Cixi in seizing power from a group of eight regents in the Xinyou Coup, and hence earned her favor. As such, after An Dehai's death, the Empress Dowager chose Li to be her new personal attendant and subsequently promoted him to the position of Grand Supervisor.

As Grand Supervisor and Empress Dowager Cixi's favorite attendant, Li held a highly influential position in the inner palace. He had control over things such as when officials could be granted an audience with the Empress Dowager and, as such, managed to acquire wealth from the bribes he collected from officials. The West Empress Dowager was eager to build up more wealth, so she began to sell official titles. Head Eunuch Li was the middle man so he got a lot of bribes. When the imperial consorts infuriated Empress Dowager Cixi, Li helped them by speaking positively about them in front of the Empress Dowager. Li was among those suspected of poisoning the Guangxu Emperor, who died in 1908 one day before Cixi's death. Other suspects included general Yuan Shikai and Empress Cixi.

Li requested permission from Empress Dowager Longyu to retire after the death of Empress Dowager Cixi in 1908. Longyu approved his request and allowed him to return home after 100 days had passed since Cixi's death. Li lived the rest of his remaining years in retirement and died in 1911 before the Xinhai Revolution broke out. He was buried in Enjizhuang in present-day Haidian District, Beijing. Li was believed to have died from dysentery. However, when his grave was raided in 1966 during the Cultural Revolution, the raiders discovered that it contained only his skull, and hence there were rumors that he was murdered (possibly decapitated). Li's grave was heavily damaged during the Cultural Revolution and only a fragment of his tombstone is left.

Portrayals in media
The 1991 Chinese film Li Lianying: The Imperial Eunuch, directed by Tian Zhuangzhuang, is based on Li's life and starred Jiang Wen as Li. The 2006 Chinese television series Princess Der Ling starred Wu Liping as Li. The 2012 Hong Kong television series The Confidant, produced by TVB, is also based on Li's life and starred Wayne Lai as Li.

References

1848 births
1911 deaths
Qing dynasty eunuchs
Politicians from Langfang
Qing dynasty politicians from Hebei